is a Japanese light novel series written by Kennoji. The series originated on the Shōsetsuka ni Narō website in June 2018, before being published in print with illustrations by KWKM by Fujimi Shobo beginning in March 2019. A manga adaptation with illustrations by Fuh Araki began serialization in the ComicWalker-based Dengeki PlayStation Comic Web manga service in July 2019.

Media

Light novel
Written by Kennoji, the series began publication on the novel posting website Shōsetsuka ni Narō on June 19, 2018. The series was later acquired by Fujimi Shobo, who began publishing the series in print with illustrations by KWKM on March 9, 2019. As of August 2021, seven volumes have been released.

In October 2020, Yen Press announced that they licensed the series for English publication.

Volume list

Manga
A manga adaptation with illustrations by Fuh Araki began serialization in the ComicWalker-based Dengeki PlayStation Comic Web manga service on July 5, 2019. As of March 2022, the series' individual chapters have been collected into five tankōbon volumes.

Yen Press is also publishing the manga in English.

Volume list

Reception
Demelza from Anime UK News criticized the story for its sex scenes and the main character as generic. Rebecca Silverman from Anime News Network felt the series was a bit generic, though she also positively noted that the series had little fan service despite the sex scenes.

See also
Failure Frame: I Became the Strongest and Annihilated Everything with Low-Level Spells, another light novel series illustrated by KWKM

References

External links
  
 

2019 Japanese novels
Anime and manga based on light novels
ASCII Media Works manga
Dengeki Comics
Fantasy anime and manga
Fujimi Shobo
Japanese webcomics
Light novels
Light novels first published online
Seinen manga
Shōsetsuka ni Narō
Webcomics in print
Yen Press titles